was the head of the Shishido clan of Aki Province during Japan's Sengoku period. He was a commander  was of Goryu castle. He married the daughter of Mōri Motonari.

References

1518 births
1592 deaths
Mōri clan
Samurai